The Nam River is a River in Gyeongsangnam-do, South Korea. It is one of the many southern tributaries of the Nakdong River.

In 1950, during the Korean War, it was the site of fierce battles between United Nations and North Korean forces, the Battle of the Nam River.

See also
Rivers of Asia
Rivers of Korea
Geography of South Korea

References

Rivers of South Korea
Rivers of South Gyeongsang Province